Susan O'Mara (born 26 February 1965) is an Irish racing cyclist from Dublin. She was the elite Irish National Champion in 1998 and the amateur champion in 1991 and 1993.

Palmarès

1991
1st,  Irish National Road Race Championships (amateur)

1993
1st,  Irish National Road Race Championships (amateur)

1994
2nd,  Irish National Road Race Championships (amateur)

1998
1st,  Irish National Road Race Championships

1999
3rd,  Irish National Time Trial Championships
3rd,  Irish National Road Race Championships

2000
2nd,  Irish National Road Race Championships

2001
1st,  Irish National Time Trial Championships
2nd,  Irish National Road Race Championships

2001
3rd,  Irish National Time Trial Championships

References

1965 births
People from County Dublin
Irish female cyclists
Dublin Wheelers cyclists
Living people